Mačkovec ( or ) is a small village north of Velika Loka in the Municipality of Trebnje in eastern Slovenia. The municipality is included in the Southeast Slovenia Statistical Region. The entire area is part of the historical region of Lower Carniola.

References

External links
Mačkovec at Geopedia

Populated places in the Municipality of Trebnje